Kazuki Kushibiki (櫛引 一紀 | born 12 February 1993) is a Japanese football player who plays for V-Varen Nagasaki.

Career
In December 2016, Kushibiki signed for Nagoya Grampus on loan, making the transfer permanent on 19 December 2017.

Career statistics

Club
Updated to 21 February 2019.

Honours
Consadole Sapporo
 J2 League (1): 2016

References

External links
 
 Kazuki Kushibiki at J. League Data Site 
 Kazuki Kushibiki at J.LEAGUE.jp (archive) 
 Kazuki Kushibiki at Nagoya Grampus 

1993 births
Living people
Association football people from Hokkaido
Japanese footballers
J1 League players
J2 League players
Hokkaido Consadole Sapporo players
Nagoya Grampus players
Sanfrecce Hiroshima players
Omiya Ardija players
V-Varen Nagasaki players
Association football defenders